The Peter and Clotilde Shipe Mansbendel House is an historic home in the Hyde Park Historic District in Austin, Texas, United States. It is also a part of the Shadow Lawn Historic District, a subdivision within the Hyde Park neighborhood established by Hyde Park founder Monroe M. Shipe.

The house was built in 1925 by Peter Mansbendel, a master carpenter who personally added carved-wood decorations to the home. Mansbendel also carved wooden doors for the mid-century restoration of the Governor's Palace in San Antonio, and provided work for Austin's first permanent public library in 1933.

The house is located at 3824 Avenue F. It was added to the National Register of Historic Places in 1990.

References

Houses in Austin, Texas
Houses on the National Register of Historic Places in Texas
National Register of Historic Places in Austin, Texas
Recorded Texas Historic Landmarks
City of Austin Historic Landmarks